The 1996 Amway Classic was a women's tennis tournament played on outdoor hard courts at the ASB Tennis Centre in Auckland in New Zealand that was part of Tier IV of the 1996 WTA Tour. The tournament was held from 1 January until 6 January 1996. Qualifier Sandra Cacic won the singles title.

Finals

Singles

 Sandra Cacic defeated  Barbara Paulus 6–3, 1–6, 6–4
 It was Cacic's only singles title of her career.

Doubles

 Els Callens /  Julie Halard-Decugis defeated  Jill Hetherington /  Kristine Radford 6–1, 6–0
 It was Callens' only title of the year and the 1st of her career. It was Halard-Decugis' 1st title of the year and the 7th of her career.

See also
 1996 BellSouth Open – men's tournament

References

External links
 ITF tournament edition details

Amway Classic
WTA Auckland Open
AM
ASB
1996 in New Zealand tennis